= Re-bar (Seattle) =

Defunct bar and nightclub in Seattle, Washington, U.S.

Coordinates: 47°37′0″N 122°19′52″W

- Logo
- Interactive map of Re-bar
- Address: Seattle; United States
- Location: Washington

Re-bar was a bar and nightclub in Seattle, in the U.S. state of Washington.
